The 1971 Minnesota Golden Gophers football team represented the University of Minnesota in the 1971 Big Ten Conference football season. In their 18th and final year under head coach Murray Warmath, the Golden Gophers compiled a 4–7 record and were outscored by their opponents by a combined total of 278 to 212.
 
Defensive end Tom Chandler received the team's Most Valuable Player award. End Doug Kingsriter was named an All-American by the Associated Press and Bob Hope. Kingsriter and linebacker Bill Light were named All-Big Ten first team. Quarterback Craig Curry, fullback Ernie Cook and offensive tackle Jack Babcock were named All-Big Ten second team. Offensive lineman Bart Buetow and linebacker Ron King were named Academic All-Big Ten.

Total attendance for the season was 207,662, which averaged to 34,610. The season high for attendance was against Michigan.

Schedule

Roster

References

Minnesota
Minnesota Golden Gophers football seasons
Minnesota Golden Gophers football